Vera Starbard (born 1982) is an Alaska Native editor and playwright.  She is a Tlingit/Denaʼaina woman born in Craig, Alaska, graduating from East Anchorage High School in Anchorage, Alaska.  In 2016, she was named Playwright-in-Residence at Perseverance Theatre in Douglas, Alaska. Her residency was renewed for Cohort 3: 2019–2022. She has written several episodes of the Molly of Denali animated children’s program airing on PBS KIDS. She is the editor of  the “First Alaskans” magazine. Vera is currently a staff writer for Alaska Daily.

Recognition 

ʼʼRasmuson Foundation Individual Artist Award in 2009  and Alaska Literary Awardʼʼ
ʼʼShe received a New York Stage And Film NEXUS grant in 2021ʼʼ

Plays

Native Pride (and Prejudice)
Fog Woman
Our Voices Will Be Heard performed 2016; published 2017; radio adaptation broadcast 2018
Devilfish (2019)
A Tlingit Christmas Carol (2020)

Episodes 

“Molly of Denali” aired on PBS Kids:
ʼʼNew Nivagi, aired August 19, 2019ʼʼ
ʼʼTurn on the Northern Lights, aired October 7, 2019ʼʼ
ʼʼCanoe Journey, aired May 29, 2020ʼʼ
ʼʼEagle Tale, aired December 9, 2020ʼʼ

References 

Tlingit people
Alaska Native people
21st-century Native American women
21st-century Native Americans
1982 births
Living people